Wola Wodyńska  is a village in the administrative district of Gmina Wodynie, within Siedlce County, Masovian Voivodeship, in east-central Poland.

External links
 Jewish Community in Wola Wodyńska on Virtual Shtetl

References

Villages in Siedlce County